is a waterfall in northern Yamanashi Prefecture Japan, on the Ishiutoro River, an upper tributary of the Fuji River. It is located in the Minami Alps National Park, in the city of Hokuto.

The Kitashōji Falls is listed as one of the "Japan’s Top 100 Waterfalls", in a listing published by the Japanese Ministry of the Environment in 1990.

The falls drop down a granite cliff, which is part of the Itoigawa-Shizuoka Tectonic Line in three cascades.

External links
  Ministry of Environment

Waterfalls of Japan
Landforms of Yamanashi Prefecture
Tourist attractions in Yamanashi Prefecture
Hokuto, Yamanashi